Events from the year 1749 in France

Incumbents
 Monarch – Louis XV

Events

Births

Full date missing
Louis-Pierre Deseine – sculptor (died 1822)

Deaths

Full date missing
André Cardinal Destouches, composer (born 1672)
Charles de la Boische, Marquis de Beauharnois, naval officer (born 1671)
Armand Gaston Maximilien de Rohan, churchman and politician (born 1674)
Pierre Subleyras, painter (born 1699)
Louis Marie, Duke of Rambouillet, prince (born 1746)
Madeleine Leroy, industrialist (born 1685)

See also

References

1740s in France